Schistura russa is a species of ray-finned fish, a stone loach, in the genus Schistura. It is known from only two locations in the Nam Tha drainage system in Laos where it is found in streams with a moderate to fast flow in riffles with pebble or stone stream beds.

References

R
Fish described in 2000